Advanced Design and Engineering Systems Solutions or ADESS is a racecar constructor based in Munich, Germany.

History

Sportscar racing
Upon completing his engineering study, Stéphane Chosse started at Équipe Ligier in 1996. After Ligier, Chosse worked for Sauber and Toyota F1. After Toyota's departure from Formula 1, Chosse founded his own engineering bureau, which became ADESS AG in 2012. The Lotus T128 LMP2 was designed and manufactured by ADESS AG in conjunction with Kodewa. The car was entered in the 2013 24 Hours of Le Mans and the 2013 FIA World Endurance Championship season. The cars had no success in the 24 Hours of Le Mans, both cars failed to finish the race. Before the race at Le Mans, Kodewa (whom entered the Lotus) and ADESS AG (whom manufactured the Lotus) were in a legal debate. ADESS AG seized the cars after Kodewa failed to pay invoices. On the other hand, Kodewa issued a statement in which they claimed that ADESS AG was in debt to them. The same day ADESS AG issued a statement in which the company denied the accusations made by Kodewa.

ADESS AG started to develop a chassis according to 2014 LMP1 regulations. ADESS AG was contracted to build the monocoque for the Nissan Zeod RC. The LMP1 project was officially put on hold on September 13, 2013. Two days before, on September 11, ADESS AG unveiled their first LMP2 racer. The ADESS-02 LMP2 Coupé was designed to compete in the 2014 24 Hours of Le Mans. It will not be fielded by ADESS AG, instead it is a customer car designed to accept a wide range of engines to power it.

Formula 1

ADESS AG performed aerodynamic development work for the HRT F1 team in 2012, the firm was responsible for the aerodynamics of the HRT F112. ADESS AG designed the whole bodywork of the car. The development of the 2013 HRT F1 car was already underway when the team went into liquidation, this ended the relationship between HRT and ADESS AG. Without the intent to consider a Formula 1 entry, ADESS AG did a preliminary study into the 2014 Formula 1 rules. It is not clear for whom the car was developed.

List of cars

References

External links
 Official website

German racecar constructors
Sports car manufacturers